Craig Schommer (born October 29, 1966) is an American former cyclist. He competed in the road race at the 1988 Summer Olympics.

References

External links
 

1966 births
Living people
American male cyclists
Olympic cyclists of the United States
Cyclists at the 1988 Summer Olympics
Sportspeople from Oakland, California